Walter Reynell may refer to:

 Walter Reynell (fl.1404), Member of Parliament for Devon in 1404
 Walter Reynell (died 1478), Member of Parliament for Devon in 1454/5